Long Strange Trip is a 2017 American documentary film about the rock band the Grateful Dead.  It premiered on January 23, 2017, at the Sundance Film Festival.  It had a one-night only nationwide screening on May 25, 2017, and a week-long limited theatrical release in New York and Los Angeles starting on May 26.  The film was split into a six-part miniseries, which became available on Amazon Prime Video on June 2, 2017.

Long Strange Trip was directed by Amir Bar-Lev, and has a running time of almost four hours.  Martin Scorsese was one of the executive producers.  Justin Kreutzmann, the son of Grateful Dead drummer Bill Kreutzmann, was one of the producers.

The film features newly conducted interviews with living band members and friends including Bob Weir and his wife Natascha, Mickey Hart, Bill Kreutzmann, Phil Lesh, John Perry Barlow, Donna Godchaux, Dennis McNally, Barbara "Brigid" Meier, Nick Paumgarten, Steve Silberman, and Alan Trist.

A soundtrack album was released on May 26, 2017.

Long Strange Trip was nominated for a Grammy Award for Best Music Film.

Critical reception
Owen Gleiberman wrote in Variety, "At three hours and 58 minutes, it has the sprawl and generosity of a good Dead show, yet there’s nothing indulgent about it – it's an ardent piece of documentary classicism.... Deadheads will drink it in and debate it, poring over every detail it works in and leaves out, yet the ultimate recommendation I can give the movie is this: I'm one of those people who can't stand the Grateful Dead... yet I found Long Strange Trip enthralling. For the first time, it made me see, and feel, and understand the slovenly glory of what they were up to, even if my ears still process their music as monotonous roots-rock wallpaper."

Jordan Hoffman wrote in Vanity Fair, "The film's first half is a typical, though very well-polished rock doc: getting the band together, how they found their sound, their struggles and successes. After intermission, the narrative goes to unexpected and extremely emotional places: an examination of intense public adoration and the burdens of fame. For lack of a better term, it becomes a real movie.... But I do think that Bar-Lev has done the impossible: his film will make those who normally scoff at those patchouli-smelling ersatz flower children tap their feet, maybe even join them for a dance."

In the Los Angeles Times, Robin Abcarian said, "I can’t imagine that anyone will walk away from Long Strange Trip, Amir Bar-Lev’s remarkable four-hour documentary about the Grateful Dead, without a newfound appreciation for the band’s music and its place in American popular culture."

Home video release
The film was made available on the Blu-ray, DVD and other digital formats on November 9, 2018.  The two-DVD release features commentary from Amir Bar-Lev and editor John Walter.  The third disc of the three-DVD Deluxe Edition contains footage of the Grateful Dead's May 24, 1970 performance at the Hollywood Festival in England.

Soundtrack album

The documentary's soundtrack album Long Strange Trip contains songs compiled from various live and studio recordings by the band, many of which had been previously released.  There are two versions of the album – one with two CDs, and another, available only from Amazon.com, with three CDs.  It was released on May 26, 2017.  The longer version of the album will be released as a six-disc vinyl LP on August 4, 2017, in a limited edition of 2,500 copies.

Critical reception
Stephen Thomas Erlewine wrote on AllMusic, "Like the film, the Long Strange Trip soundtrack skips entire portions of the Dead's history because it focuses on the bigger picture. Some eras are soft-peddled and some classic songs are missing but by threading in studio cuts with the live tracks, this gives a good idea of everything the Grateful Dead did and why they matter."

Track listing

Personnel
Jerry Garcia – guitar, vocals
Bob Weir – guitar, vocals
Phil Lesh – bass, vocals
Bill Kreutzmann – drums, percussion
Mickey Hart – drums, percussion
Ron "Pigpen" McKernan – organ, harmonica, percussion, vocals
Tom Constanten – keyboards
Keith Godchaux – keyboards
Donna Jean Godchaux – vocals
Brent Mydland – keyboards, vocals
Vince Welnick – keyboards, vocals

References

External links
Long Strange Trip on Amazon Prime Video

Documentary films about musical groups
2017 films
2010s English-language films